Ji-Paraná Futebol Clube, commonly referred to as Ji-Paraná, is a Brazilian football club based in Ji-Paraná, Rondônia. The club competes in the Campeonato Rondoniense Série A, the top division in the Rondônia state football league system.

The club is Rondônia's most successful club still in activity. 

As of 2022, Ji-Paraná is the fifth-best ranked team from Rondônia in CBF's national club ranking, being placed 170th overall.

History
On April 22, 1991, Ji-Paraná was founded.

On August 18, 1991, the club played its first official match, against Operário of Rondônia. The Campeonato Rondoniense match was played in Pimenta Bueno, and ended in a 1-1 draw.

On September 18, 1991, the club won its first match. The club beat Colorado of Rondônia 3-1, in Cerejeiras.

On December 15, 1991, Ji-Paraná won the Campeonato Rondoniense, its first title. The club beat Ferroviário of Rondônia in the final. The competition's top goalscorer was Itamar, of Ji-Paraná.

In 1992, the club disputed the Campeonato Brasileiro Série C for the first time. Ji-Paraná was eliminated in the first stage, after finishing in the group's last position. The club also disputed Copa do Brasil for the first time in that year, and was eliminated in the first stage by Grêmio.

In 1995, Ji-Paraná disputed again the Campeonato Brasileiro Série C. The club was eliminated by Atlético Goianiense in the quarterfinals.

In 1996, Ji-Paraná reached the Campeonato Brasileiro Série C third stage. The club was eliminated by Nacional of Amazonas.

In 1997, the club reached the fourth stage of the Série C. Juventus of São Paulo eliminated the club.

In 1999, 2002, 2004  and 2005, Ji-Paraná disputed the Série C. In all those seasons the club was eliminated in the first stage.

In 2000, the club reached Copa do Brasil's second stage. It was the club's all-time best performance in the competition. Ji-Paraná was eliminated by Bahia in that year.

Titles
Campeonato Rondoniense (9): 1991, 1992, 1995, 1996, 1997, 1998, 1999, 2001, 2012
Taça Rondônia Eucatur de Futebol (1): 2001

Stadium
The club's home matches are usually played at Biancão stadium, which has a maximum capacity of 3,000 people. Ji-Paraná also plays at :pt:Biancão, which has a maximum capacity of 5,000 people.

Nickname
Ji-Paraná is nicknamed Jipa, which is a syllabic abbreviation of the club's name. Another club's nickname is Galo da BR, meaning Rooster of the BR. BR is the name of a highway

Colors
The club's colors are blue, white and red.

Mascot
Ji-Paraná's mascot is a rooster (galo in Portuguese language).

References

External links
Ji Paraná at Arquivo de Clubes

Association football clubs established in 1991
Football clubs in Rondônia
1991 establishments in Brazil
football